The second season of Lucha Underground, a Lucha libre or professional wrestling television show, began on January 27, 2016 and is broadcast on the El Rey Network in the United States. The show chronicles events that take place in the "Lucha Underground Temple". The producers behind Lucha Underground announced that the second season was a reality on September 21. Unlike the first season the second season of Lucha Underground was not picked up by UniMás and thus not broadcast in Mexico. The first episode was taped on November 15, 2015 in Boyle Heights, Los Angeles, California.

Plot overview
At the beginning of season two, Lucha Underground Temple owner Dario Cueto (Luis Fernandez-Gil) has been absent from the Temple since the end of season 1 and Catrina (Karlee Perez) has taken charge of the temple, leaving it a "much darker place" as Matt Striker comments during the opening scene. Under her management Lucha Underground Champion Mil Muertes (Gilbert Cosme) and Lucha Underground Trios Champions the Disciples of Death control the operation. In their quest to control everything, Catrina hires King Cuerno to take the Gift of the Gods Championship from Fénix. Fénix defeated Mil Muertes to win the championship, only for Catrina to force him to defend the title during Aztec Warfare II. During the match Cueto dramatically returns, unleashing his brother Matanza on the temple, winning the Lucha Underground Championship in the process. Over the next few weeks, running alongside a tournament for the Lucha Underground Trios Championship, The Monster Matanza Cueto would go on to easily dispatch top technicos in the promotion like Pentagon Jr. and Fenix. Matanza's first real challenge came in the form of the former Lucha Underground Champion Mil Muertes. In their initial encounter, Mil Muertes delivered his finisher, the flatliner, to the Monster which sent both monsters through the roof of Dario Cueto's office. This put both monsters out of commission for several weeks and gave the crowd something that's rare in Lucha Underground, a no-contest finish.

Cast and crew

Episodes

Reception

Critical reception 
Lucha Underground's second season has received a mixed reception critically compared to the first, with more fans and professional wrestling media outlets aware of the product in its sophomore season. Loyal Lucha Underground fans have commended its storytelling and match quality, as well as its portrayal of women's wrestling, which some consider to be revolutionary while others remain uncomfortable with the concept of women wrestling men (particularly when the male opponent is a much larger and more powerful fighter, cf., Taya vs Cage) At Prowrestling.net, journalists Will Pruett and John Moore who were huge proponents of Lucha Underground's initial direction have criticized the second part of Season 2 as being both deflating and unorganized. Will Pruett in particular has stated that "Where Lucha Underground failed in 2016 was their storytelling. They didn’t support these great matches and moments wrestlers created in The Temple. They didn’t honor the experiences they wanted fans to have. The structure of the show felt fragmented, with far fewer episodes naturally leading into the next." PwTorch.com contributor Joel Dehnel has praised Lucha Underground for being "capable of doing some really great things" but "They are going to the well too many times in these matches with having no rules and high spots in the crowd that ultimately lead to nothing." He also stated that "they have gotten away far too many times with stories that make no sense and matches that are about entertaining the fans instead of telling a great story through visuals."

Ratings

References

External links
 Official website
 MGM webpage for Lucha Underground

2016 American television seasons
Lucha Underground